The men's Greco-Roman light heavyweight competition at the 1964 Summer Olympics in Tokyo took place from 16 to 19 October at the Komazawa Gymnasium. Nations were limited to one competitor.

Competition format

This Greco-Roman wrestling competition continued to use the "bad points" elimination system introduced at the 1928 Summer Olympics for Greco-Roman and at the 1932 Summer Olympics for freestyle wrestling, as adjusted at the 1960 Summer Olympics. Each bout awarded 4 points. If the victory was by fall, the winner received 0 and the loser 4. If the victory was by decision, the winner received 1 and the loser 3. If the bout was tied, each wrestler received 2 points. A wrestler who accumulated 6 or more points was eliminated. Rounds continued until there were 3 or fewer uneliminated wrestlers. If only 1 wrestler remained, he received the gold medal. If 2 wrestlers remained, point totals were ignored and they faced each other for gold and silver (if they had already wrestled each other, that result was used). If 3 wrestlers remained, point totals were ignored and a round-robin was held among those 3 to determine medals (with previous head-to-head results, if any, counting for this round-robin).

Results

Round 1

Mane withdrew after his bout.

 Bouts

 Points

Round 2

Four wrestlers were eliminated, leaving 13 in competition. Kiehl and Radev each made it through the first two rounds with 0 points.

 Bouts

 Points

Round 3

Four more wrestlers were eliminated. Radev still had 0 points, while the next closest wrestlers had 3. 

 Bouts

 Points

Round 4

More than half of the wrestlers (5 of 9) were eliminated. Radev finally received his first point, but still led at 1—guaranteeing he would make it through round 5 as well. 

 Bouts

 Points

Round 5

The fifth round eliminated 3 of the 4 remaining wrestlers; Radev, as the only man left with fewer than 6 points, took the gold medal. The tie in the standings between Svensson and Kiehl was broken by their head-to-head results in this round; Svensson won the bout between them and earned silver.

 Bouts

 Points

References

Wrestling at the 1964 Summer Olympics